Edward Jennings (born March 15, 1990), known as Ted or Teddy Jennings, is a former American football defensive end who played for four seasons for the Philadelphia Soul of the Arena Football League (AFL). He was signed by the Soul as an undrafted free agent in 2014. He played college football at Connecticut. Jennings was selected by the Beijing Lions of the China Arena Football League (CAFL) in the fourth round of the 2016 CAFL Draft.

References

External links
 Just Sports Stats
 UCONN Huskies bio
 Arena Football League bio
 

1990 births
Living people
Players of American football from Dayton, Ohio
Players of Canadian football from Dayton, Ohio
American football defensive ends
Canadian football defensive linemen
American players of Canadian football
UConn Huskies football players
Philadelphia Soul players
Blacktips (FXFL) players
Montreal Alouettes players
Beijing Lions players